Aneury De Jesús Tavárez Trinidad  (born April 14, 1992) is a Dominican professional baseball outfielder for the Generales de Durango of the Mexican League.

Career

Boston Red Sox
The Red Sox signed Tavárez as an international free agent in October 2010, signing him a bonus of $80,000. His first four seasons in the minors were unremarkable – a combined .254 batting average (289-for-1136) with 336 strikeouts and just 66 walks in 314 games.

Tavárez opened 2015 with the Class A-Advanced Salem Red Sox, where he improved to .280 with a .444 OBP and .447 of slugging in 39 games. He then was promoted to the Double-A Portland Sea Dogs during the midseason and ended the year with the Triple-A Pawtucket Red Sox. Overall, he posted a .253/.314/.401 slash line with a .715 OPS in 112 games. After the season, he was selected to the roster for the Dominican Republic national baseball team at the 2015 WBSC Premier12.

Tavárez settled into Double-A in 2016, after spending the 2015 season at three levels, and struggled early in the year. As late as May 5, he was hitting .219 with a .534 OPS and was fighting for playing time before settling down in June, when he posted a robust .413 average and was briefly called up to Pawtucket for six games. Tavárez produced again in Triple-A, hitting .389/.522/.667 with a one home run and five RBI, while collecting a 1.188 OPS. Following his return on July 1 to Double-A, Tavárez hit .341 for the Sea Dogs during the month, boost his batting average to .336 in August, and finished the season with a career-high 12-game hitting streak, in which he went 15-for-37 (.405), missing out on the Eastern League batting title by a narrow margin. Binghamton Mets infielder Phillip Evans overtook Tavárez on the last day of the season, edging him .3351 to .3350. Tavárez led the league in triples (13), along with a third-best .379 OBP (.379) and fourth-bests in SLG (.506) and OPS (.886). He also earned Portland Sea Dogs Most Valuable Player honors and was named to both the Eastern League mid-season and season-ending All-Star teams. Adidionally, Tavárez led the Red Sox minor league system in average and triples, ranking third both in slugging and OPS behind Andrew Benintendi (.532/.910) and Yoan Moncada (.511/.918), fifth in OBP, sixth in hits (132), and eighth in stolen bases (20).

Baltimore Orioles
On December 8, 2016, Tavárez was selected by the Baltimore Orioles in the 2016 Rule 5 draft. He did not play in any regular seasons minor league games for Baltimore.

Second stint with Red Sox
Tavárez was returned to Boston from Baltimore on April 2, 2017. He spent the season with three Red Sox teams: Class A Short Season Lowell (7 games), Double-A Portland (18 games), and Triple-A Pawtucket (33 games). Overall, he batted .272 with five home runs and 22 RBIs in 58 games played.

Tavárez opened the 2018 season with Triple-A Pawtucket. He elected free agency on November 3, 2018.

On January 25, 2019, Tavárez re-signed to a minor league deal with the Red Sox. He was released on May 10, 2019.

Generales de Durango
On May 27, 2019, Tavárez signed with the Generales de Durango of the Mexican League. Tavárez did not play in a game in 2020 due to the cancellation of the Mexican League season because of the COVID-19 pandemic.

References

External links

SoxProspects.com

1992 births
Living people
Dominican Republic expatriate baseball players in Mexico
Dominican Republic expatriate baseball players in the United States
Dominican Republic national baseball team players
Estrellas Orientales players
Generales de Durango players
Greenville Drive players
Gulf Coast Red Sox players

Lowell Spinners players
Mexican League baseball center fielders
Pawtucket Red Sox players
People from Distrito Nacional
Portland Sea Dogs players
Salem Red Sox players
Venados de Mazatlán players
Yaquis de Obregón players
2015 WBSC Premier12 players